The Premier Automotive Group (PAG) was an organizational division within the Ford Motor Company formed in 1999 to oversee the business operations of Ford's high-end automotive marques. The PAG was gradually dismantled from 2006 to 2011 with the divestiture of its constituent brands.

History
The Premier Automotive Group was formed in 1999 under then-CEO Jacques Nasser. It grew to include responsibility for the Lincoln, Mercury, Aston Martin, Jaguar, Land Rover and Volvo brands. Forbes estimated that, by 2004, Ford had spent $17 billion building on acquisitions to form PAG.

Lincoln and Mercury were returned to Ford direct control in 2002. Lincoln's headquarters had been merged into PAG's North American office, where it was run by a German executive who was based in London, England.

The four other marques in the PAG, Aston Martin, Jaguar, Land Rover and Volvo, were essentially completely different car companies with their own unique markets and dealer networks, so there were few synergies that could be achieved by combining them under one division. Ford attempted to push these brands to share parts and engineering in order to cut costs. This made some vehicles too similar to mass-market Fords, notably the Jaguar X-Type which was a capable compact executive car yet its reputation suffered mainly because it shared a platform with the Ford Mondeo. While Volvo had been one of the more successful entry-level luxury brands in the United States with the Volvo 740/940 and S70 when it was independent, it lost market share to the German luxury marques like BMW and Mercedes-Benz who had expanded their entry-level offerings extensively.

When Alan Mulally became Ford's president and CEO in September 2006, the Premier Automotive Group began to be dismantled. Ford sold 92% of Aston Martin, to a consortium of investors, headed by David Richards in 2007. In September 2006, the rights to use the defunct Rover brand were secured from BMW by Ford to protect the Land Rover brand. In March 2008, Ford sold Jaguar and Land Rover to Indian carmaker Tata Motors. In 2010, Ford sold the Swedish brand Volvo Cars, the last of the PAG, to the parent of Chinese carmaker Geely for $1.8 billion.

Management
 1999–2002: Wolfgang Reitzle
 2002–2005: Mark Fields
 2005–2008: Lewis Booth

Headquarters
The Premier Automotive Group headquarters were located at 1 Premier Place in Irvine, California. It is next door to the Mazda North American Operations office, and is now the main office for Taco Bell.

The Premier Automotive Group office in the United States was completed in 2001 at a cost of $68 million. It was the first Ford building and the first building in Orange County to qualify for Leadership in Energy and Environmental Design classification from the U.S. Green Building Council. When the headquarters first opened, some of its floors were each specifically dedicated to one of PAG's brands. The complex also included a separate  product development centre. In late 2008, a deal was announced to lease the former PAG headquarters building in Irvine to the Taco Bell restaurant chain.  Although Ford planned to leave a small product development staff on the property, this was widely seen as the end of the PAG story and an ironic comment on the expensive failure of Ford's luxury-car strategy. The New York Times asked dryly, "Will they install a drive-up window?"

Members

Aston Martin
Aston Martin was a member of PAG. Ford acquired an interest in Aston Martin in 1987 and had full control from 1991. It was sold on 12 March 2007 for £479 million. However, Ford retained a £40 million (8%) stake in Aston Martin.

Lincoln
Ford's luxury car division, Lincoln, was part of the Premier Auto Group in the late 1990s, but was pulled out in 2002 as part of Ford's marketing strategy to separate its "import" marques from its domestic ones. During the creation of PAG, Lincoln's line-up received a complete overhaul, beginning with the 1998 redesign of the Lincoln Town Car. The same year also saw the introduction of the Lincoln Navigator SUV and in 2000 the Lincoln LS, which shared its engines and platform with the Jaguar S-Type, was introduced. All three cars were designed in Irvine, California and were, according to many critics, heavily influenced by Jaguar design themes. In both years 1998 and 2000 Lincoln was the best-selling luxury car brand in the US. After Cadillac surged back into the market in 2002, however, Ford pulled Lincoln out of the PAG in what is according to Jerry Flint of Forbes magazine an "impossible to make sense out of... strategy."

Jaguar

Ford made an offer for Jaguar stock in 1989. It was placed in Premier Automotive Group when it was formed. After acquiring Land Rover, Ford market Jaguar and Land Rover together and sold them off together in 2008.

Land Rover
Ford acquired Land Rover from BMW in 2000 after the break-up of the former Rover Group. On 18 September 2006, Ford announced the purchase of the rights to use the Rover name. BMW had licensed the Rover name to MG Rover Group from 2000 until 2005, when MG Rover collapsed after a failed merger with SAIC. As part of Ford's initial purchase of Land Rover, Ford had the first option to purchase the Rover name if MG Rover Group ceased trading. Ford did not plan to use the name in production, instead buying it merely to protect their use of the name Land Rover.

Ford sold Jaguar and Land Rover to Tata Motors in March 2008 for £1.15 billion. As part of Ford's sale of Jaguar and Land Rover to Tata Motors, the defunct Rover brand name was included, as well as the Daimler and Lanchester marques.

Volvo Cars
Ford acquired Volvo's automotive division in 1999 while Volvo's commercial vehicles division became a separate company. Both share the use of symbols and trademarks. Geely was reported to have approached Ford in mid-2008 about a possible takeover of Volvo Cars. On 28 October 2009, Geely was named as the preferred buyer of Volvo Cars by Ford. On 23 December 2009, Ford confirmed that all substantive commercial terms for the sale to Geely had been settled. Geely signed a deal with Ford to acquire Volvo Cars for $1.8 billion on 28 March 2010 and closed the deal on 2 August 2010.

References 

 
Ford Motor Company
Luxury motor vehicle manufacturers
Vehicle manufacturing companies established in 1999
Vehicle manufacturing companies disestablished in 2010
1999 establishments in Michigan
2010 disestablishments in Michigan
American companies established in 1999
American companies disestablished in 2010
Defunct manufacturing companies based in Michigan